The Bora (former MRK-27) is a  in the Soviet Navy and later the Russian Navy.

Construction and career 
MRK-27 was launched in 1987 at the A.M. Gorky Shipyard, Zelenodolsk and commissioned on 30 December 1989.

On 19 March 1992, he was renamed Bora.

In 1997, she was put into the Black Sea Fleet.

Pennant numbers

Citations 

Ships built in Russia
1987 ships
Corvettes of the Russian Navy
Corvettes of the Soviet Navy